The Kelly Nunataks are the nunataks that mark the eastern extremity of the Clark Mountains, in the Ford Ranges of Marie Byrd Land, Antarctica. They were mapped by the United States Geological Survey from surveys and U.S. Navy air photos, 1959–65, and were named by the Advisory Committee on Antarctic Names for John David Kelly, a United States Antarctic Research Program ionospheric physicist at Byrd Station, 1968.

References

Nunataks of Marie Byrd Land